The WRLP Tower, also known as the Gunn Mountain Tower, is a guyed television mast located in Winchester, New Hampshire, United States. The tower bears FCC registration number 1023108. It is the tallest man-made structure in the state of New Hampshire.

WRLP constructed a television mast prior to their debut on May 15, 1957. That tower had to be taken down in August 1966 after a small aircraft struck a guy wire during dense fog, killing both occupants of the aircraft. The existing tower was built as a replacement later that year. WRLP ceased operation on April 9, 1978, but the tower remains standing. 

As of September 2004, photographs of the tower showed that the antenna assembly atop the mast had been removed, likely reducing its actual height from its registered height.

See also
List of tallest structures in the United States

References

External links
 
 

Towers in New Hampshire
1966 establishments in New Hampshire
Towers completed in 1966